Jackie Stewart (born 1939) is a former Formula One world champion racing driver

Jackie Stewart may also refer to:

Jackie Stewart (footballer, born 1921) (1921–1990), Raith Rovers and Birmingham City player
Jackie Stewart (footballer, born 1929) (1929–2004), Dunfermline Athletic, East Fife and Walsall player
Jackie Stewart (football manager), Scottish football player and manager

See also
Jack Stewart (disambiguation)
John Stewart (disambiguation)
Jackson Stewart (disambiguation)